DWH can stand for:

 Domino Web Access, an IBM software product.
 Data warehouse
 Drain water heat recovery
 David Wayne Hooks Memorial Airport
 Deepwater Horizon, oil drilling rig destroyed in an incident that resulted in a large oil spill